Amblyscirtes exoteria, the large roadside skipper, is a species of grass skipper in the butterfly family Hesperiidae.

References

Further reading

 

Hesperiinae
Articles created by Qbugbot
Butterflies described in 1869
Butterflies of North America
Butterflies of Central America
Taxa named by Gottlieb August Wilhelm Herrich-Schäffer